Cezayirli Gazi Hasan Pasha Monument is a monument in Çeşme ilçe (district) of İzmir Province, Turkey. The monument is situated in Çeşme downtown in front of the historical castle at 

Cezayirli Gazi Hasan Pasha (1713-1790) was an Ottoman admiral and later grand vizier. He was famous for his domesticated lion which be bought during his service in Algiers. He was a captain during the naval Battle of Çeşme which was fought mainly in the bay of Çeşme.  In the battle Cezayirli Hasan Pasha distinguished himself as an able seaman. Although the battle was disastrous for the Ottoman navy the admiral Hüsamettin Pasha was blamed for the defeat and Cezayirli Hasan Pasha was promoted after the battle.

Thus Çeşme is a convient place to erect a statue of Cezayirli Gazi Hasan Pasha. The  monument was created by Haluk Tezonar (1942-1995), an academic in State College of Fine and Applied Arts  in 1974. The monument depicts Cezayirli Hasan Pasha standing with his lion beside him.

References

Tourist attractions in İzmir Province
Çeşme
Monuments and memorials in İzmir